The June Sprints are amateur sports car races held yearly on the third or fourth weekend of June at Road America in Elkhart Lake, Wisconsin. The event was first held in 1956 as a round of the SCCA National Sports Car Championship, as a shorter-format alternative to the Road America 500.

The June Sprints are hosted by the Chicago Region of the Sports Car Club of America. Unlike the SCCA National Championship Runoffs (held at Road America between 2009 and 2013), the June Sprints are open to any nationally licensed driver in good standing with the SCCA.

Motorsport in Wisconsin
Tourist attractions in Sheboygan County, Wisconsin
Sports car races
Sports Car Club of America